Mirzaoğlu is a village in the Çayırlı District, Erzincan Province, Turkey. The village had a population of 58 in 2021.

The hamlet of Hacıbektaş is attached to the village.

References 

Villages in Çayırlı District